Dane Wairangi Manurea Koopu (born 2 April 1980) is a New Zealand former professional rugby league footballer who played for the New Zealand Warriors and the Melbourne Storm in the National Rugby League. He is now a reporter for The Crowd Goes Wild. He is fluent in Te Reo Maori and often appeared on Māori Television.

Background
Koopu was born in Opotiki, New Zealand on 2 April 1980.  He is of Te Whānau-ā-Apanui and Ngāti Awa iwi.

Playing career
Koopu started playing rugby league for the Taniwharau Rugby League club in Huntly, where he attended school at Te Wharekura o Rakaumanga. In 1998 he also represented the Waikato Cougars, played for the Junior Kiwis and was named in the National Māori tournament team after representing Waikato Māori. During the early part of 1999, Koopu played for the Glenora Bears and represented Auckland North. While contracted to the Warriors, Koopu also played in the then feeder clubs for the NRL franchise, the Wynnum Manly Seagulls and the Newtown Jets. Koopu also represented the NZ Maori at the 2000 RLWC and played for the Kiwi's 3 times.

Warriors
Koopu made his first grade debut for the Auckland Warriors in Round 6, 1999. He went on to play for the club 159 times, earning the nickname "Mr Consistency". Koopu played for the New Zealand Māori in 1999 and at the 2000 Rugby League World Cup.

Koopu played for the New Zealand Warriors from the interchange bench in their 2002 NRL Grand Final loss to the Sydney Roosters. It was not until 2004 that he made his debut for the New Zealand national rugby league team. Koopu seriously injured his shoulder in 2006 and never fully regained his consistency with the Warriors. As a result, after ten years with the Warriors, Koopu was released by the club at the end of the 2008 season. That year Koopu again played for the New Zealand Māori in two games, including a match against an Indigenous Dreamtime side.

Melbourne
After being released by the Warriors, Koopu accepted a one-year contract with the Melbourne Storm for the 2009 season. Koopu was named as reserve for the Storm team that won the 2009 NRL Grand Final, a premiership that was later stripped after their long-term salary cap breaches came to light in 2010.

Later years
In 2010 Koopu played alongside Stacey Jones and Awen Guttenbeil in rebuilding Pt Chev Pirates rugby league club in Auckland Rugby League's Phelan Shield.

In 2015, he was named at loose forward in Taniwharau's team of their first 70 years.

References

1980 births
Living people
Auckland rugby league team players
Glenora Bears players
Junior Kiwis players
Melbourne Storm players
New Zealand Māori rugby league players
New Zealand Māori rugby league team players
New Zealand national rugby league team players
New Zealand rugby league commentators
New Zealand rugby league players
New Zealand Warriors players
Point Chevalier Pirates players
Rugby league centres
Rugby league players from Ōpōtiki
Rugby league second-rows
Taniwharau Rugby League Club players
Waikato rugby league team players